Left Foot, Right Foot is the third album by Australian hip hop group Hilltop Hoods. It was released in 2001. To promote the album the group performed six or seven shows over a few months.

Track listing

There is an additional track that is hidden and is playable if the album is rewound while playing Track 1.
 "Afternoon Group Session" (Daniel Smith, Matthew Lambert) - 3:53

Personnel
 Daniel Smith — vocals
 Matthew Lambert — vocals
 Nick Lambert — guitar (track 2)
 Jodie Morgan — vocals (tracks 3, 14)
 Chris Lambert — double bass (track 5), percussion (track 9)
 Hau Latukefu — vocals (track 6)
 Danielsan Ichiban — scratches (track 6)
 Adam Markey — bass guitar (track 11)
 G. Kordas — scratches (track 12)
 Barry Francis — vocals (track 15), scratches (track 20)
 Gianni Valente — vocals (track 15)
 M. Veraguth — vocals (track 15)
 Daniel Yates — scratches (track 17)

Credits
 Mastered: Neville Clarke
 Producer: Matthew Lambert (tracks 1-10, 12-14, 16-20); Barry Francis & M. Veraguth (track 11 & 15)
 Artwork: J. Englehardt

References

Hilltop Hoods albums
2001 albums